Satinderpal "Sonia" Sidhu  is a Canadian politician who was elected as a Member of Parliament in the House of Commons of Canada to represent the federal electoral district of Brampton South during the 2015 Canadian federal election.

Early life
Born in India, Sidhu arrived in Canada in 1992.

Political career
Sonia Sidhu is the Member of Parliament for Brampton South. She was elected on October 19, 2015 as the Liberal candidate. Before politics, she worked for over 18 years in the healthcare field as a diabetes educator and research coordinator. Sonia has worked as a volunteer on political campaigns at all three levels of government, and she also volunteered with numerous organisations.

In Parliament, she sits on the House of Commons’ Standing Committee on Health, and also was appointed to sit as a member of the Special Committee on Pay Equity. She is also the Chair and the Liberal caucus champion for the All-Party Diabetes Caucus. MP Sidhu is also the General-Secretary of the Canada-India Parliamentary Friendship Group and an executive member of both the Canada-Poland and Canada-Portugal Parliamentary Friendship Groups.  She further sits as a member of the Canada-Europe Parliamentary Association, the Canada-U.S. Inter-Parliamentary Group, and the Commonwealth Parliamentary Association.

During the 43rd Canadian Parliament Sidhu's private member bill An Act to establish a national framework for diabetes (Bill C-237) was adopted to require the Minister of Health, within one year, to develop a framework to improve access to information on diabetes prevention and treatment.

Personal life
She lives in her riding of Brampton South with her husband, Gurjit. She has twin daughters and a son.

Electoral record

References

External links 

 Official Twitter
 Official Website
 Parliamentary Website

Liberal Party of Canada MPs
Living people
Members of the House of Commons of Canada from Ontario
Women members of the House of Commons of Canada
Canadian cardiologists
Women cardiologists
Women in Ontario politics
Canadian politicians of Punjabi descent
21st-century Canadian politicians
21st-century Canadian women politicians
Canadian politicians of Indian descent
Politicians from Brampton
Year of birth missing (living people)